Ulidavaru Kandanthe is the soundtrack album composed by B. Ajaneesh Loknath, for the 2014 film of the same name. The album features twelve tracks in number with four instrumentals and had lyrics written by Rakshit Shetty, Vigneshwar Vishwa, Suni, Yogaraj Bhat, Manojava Galgali. The album was released on 7 March 2014.

Reception
Kavya Christopher of The Times of India reviewed the album, gave it a four star rating, and wrote, "The songs of Ulidavaru Kandante do not conform to idea of commercial hit numbers and that in itself sets them apart from the rest. They are absolutely local in the sense that they capture the situation and mood of the storyline or situation in the most rustic way possible." She concluded, "This is one music album that is a must-listen, again and again."

Track listing

Other versions 
Four of the songs were used in the film's Tamil remake Richie (2017), which was also composed by Ajaneesh.

References

2014 soundtrack albums
Kannada film soundtracks
Action film soundtracks
B. Ajaneesh Lokanath soundtracks